The Lorraine 7M Mizar, also called the Lorraine 240CV Mizar, was a seven-cylinder air-cooled radial engine designed and built in France during the 1920s and 1930s.

Variants
7Ma Mizar
7Mb Mizar
7Me Mizar
7Mer Mizar

Applications

 Aviméta 92
 Caudron C.251

Specifications

References

Notes

Bibliography

 

1920s aircraft piston engines
Mizar